Seals of governors of the U.S. states are the primary symbols of the executive office of the governor in several states of the United States, similar in concept to the seal of the president of the United States and seal of the vice president of the United States. Governors of some states, such as Washington and Oregon, simply use the state seal in their role as chief executive.

Instead of a seal, the state of Hawaii uses a logo for the office of governor and lieutenant governor. This logo follows the design used by the White House logo.


Seals

States

Territories

Logos

See also
 Flags of the governors of the U.S. states
 Governor (United States)
 Coats of arms of the U.S. states
 Seals of the U.S. states
 Seal of the President of the United States
 Seal of the Vice President of the United States

References

External links